Goeppertia dodsonii (syn. Calathea dodsonii) is a species of flowering plant in the Marantaceae family. It is endemic to Ecuador.  Its natural habitat is subtropical or tropical moist lowland forests.

References

dodsonii
Endemic flora of Ecuador
Critically endangered plants
Taxonomy articles created by Polbot
Taxobox binomials not recognized by IUCN